The 2001–02 Toronto Maple Leafs season was the team's 85th season as a franchise, and the 75th season as the Maple Leafs. They finished second in the Northeast Division with a record of 43–25–10–4 for 100 points. Qualifying for the Stanley Cup playoffs as the fourth seed in the Eastern Conference, they downed the New York Islanders in seven games in the Conference Quarterfinals and the Ottawa Senators in seven games in the Conference Semifinals. However, their luck ran out in the Conference Finals, as they were eliminated by the Carolina Hurricanes in six games.

Leafs captain Mats Sundin ranked fourth in the NHL in scoring, with 80 points. Head Coach Pat Quinn and goaltender Curtis Joseph were members of the gold medal-winning  Canadian ice hockey team at the 2002 Winter Olympics.

In 2010, the 2001–02 Toronto Maple Leafs were named the 22nd most hated team in sports history by Sports Illustrated.

Off-season
Key dates prior to the start of the season:
 The 2001 NHL Entry Draft
 The free agency period began on July 1.

Regular season

Season standings

Playoffs
The Maple Leafs qualified for the Stanley Cup playoffs for the fourth consecutive year. After defeating the New York Islanders in the first round and Ottawa Senators in the second round, both in seven games, they were eliminated by the Carolina Hurricanes in the Conference Finals in six games.

Schedule and results

Regular season

|-  style="text-align:center; background:#fbb;"
|1||L||October 3, 2001||4–5 || style="text-align:left;"|  Ottawa Senators (2001–02) ||0–1–0–0 || 
|-  style="text-align:center;"
|2||T||October 6, 2001||2–2 || style="text-align:left;"| @ Montreal Canadiens (2001–02) ||0–1–1–0 || 
|-  style="text-align:center; background:#cfc"
|3||W||October 8, 2001||6–1 || style="text-align:left;"|  Mighty Ducks of Anaheim (2001–02) ||1–1–1–0 || 
|-  style="text-align:center; background:#cfc;"
|4||W||October 11, 2001||3–2 || style="text-align:left;"| @ Carolina Hurricanes (2001–02) ||2–1–1–0 || 
|-  style="text-align:center; background:#fbb;"
|5||L||October 13, 2001||2–5 || style="text-align:left;"|  St. Louis Blues (2001–02) ||2–2–1–0 || 
|-  style="text-align:center; background:#cfc;"
|6||W||October 16, 2001||4–1 || style="text-align:left;"| @ Edmonton Oilers (2001–02) ||3–2–1–0 || 
|-  style="text-align:center; background:#cfc;"
|7||W||October 18, 2001||6–5 || style="text-align:left;"| @ Vancouver Canucks (2001–02) ||4–2–1–0 || 
|-  style="text-align:center; background:#fbb;"
|8||L||October 20, 2001||1–4 || style="text-align:left;"| @ Calgary Flames (2001–02) ||4–3–1–0 || 
|-  style="text-align:center; background:#cfc;"
|9||W||October 23, 2001||2–0 || style="text-align:left;"|  Boston Bruins (2001–02) ||5–3–1–0 || 
|-  style="text-align:center; background:#ffc;"
|10||OTL||October 25, 2001||1–2 OT|| style="text-align:left;"| @ Boston Bruins (2001–02) ||5–3–1–1 || 
|-  style="text-align:center; background:#cfc;"
|11||W||October 27, 2001||4–0 || style="text-align:left;"|  Pittsburgh Penguins (2001–02) ||6–3–1–1 || 
|-  style="text-align:center; background:#cfc;"
|12||W||October 30, 2001||3–2 || style="text-align:left;"|  Tampa Bay Lightning (2001–02) ||7–3–1–1 || 
|-

|-  style="text-align:center; background:#fbb;"
|13||L||November 1, 2001||1–3 || style="text-align:left;"| @ Pittsburgh Penguins (2001–02) ||7–4–1–1 || 
|-  style="text-align:center; background:#cfc;"
|14||W||November 3, 2001||4–1 || style="text-align:left;"|  Colorado Avalanche (2001–02) ||8–4–1–1 || 
|-  style="text-align:center; background:#cfc;"
|15||W||November 6, 2001||4–2 || style="text-align:left;"|  Washington Capitals (2001–02) ||9–4–1–1 || 
|-  style="text-align:center; background:#ffc;"
|16||OTL||November 9, 2001||2–3 OT|| style="text-align:left;"| @ New Jersey Devils (2001–02) ||9–4–1–2 || 
|- style="text-align:center;"
|17||T||November 10, 2001 †||1–1 OT|| style="text-align:left;"|  New Jersey Devils (2001–02) ||9–4–2–2 || 
|-  style="text-align:center; background:#cfc;"
|18||W||November 14, 2001||3–2 || style="text-align:left;"| @ Florida Panthers (2001–02) ||10–4–2–2 || 
|-  style="text-align:center; background:#cfc;"
|19||W||November 15, 2001||3–2 || style="text-align:left;"| @ Tampa Bay Lightning (2001–02) ||11–4–2–2 || 
|-  style="text-align:center; background:#ffc;"
|20||OTL||November 17, 2001||1–2 OT|| style="text-align:left;"| @ Ottawa Senators (2001–02) ||11–4–2–3 || 
|-  style="text-align:center; background:#cfc;"
|21||W||November 19, 2001||5–1 || style="text-align:left;"|  Florida Panthers (2001–02) ||12–4–2–3 || 
|-  style="text-align:center; background:#fbb;"
|22||L||November 21, 2001||2–4 || style="text-align:left;"| @ Buffalo Sabres (2001–02) ||12–5–2–3 || 
|-  style="text-align:center; background:#fbb;"
|23||L||November 23, 2001||1–3 || style="text-align:left;"| @ New York Islanders (2001–02) ||12–6–2–3 || 
|-  style="text-align:center; background:#cfc;"
|24||W||November 24, 2001||2–0 || style="text-align:left;"|  Boston Bruins (2001–02) ||13–6–2–3 || 
|-  style="text-align:center; background:#fbb;"
|25||L||November 27, 2001||2–5 || style="text-align:left;"|  Carolina Hurricanes (2001–02) ||13–7–2–3 || 
|-  style="text-align:center; background:#cfc;"
|26||W||November 30, 2001||2–1 || style="text-align:left;"| @ Chicago Blackhawks (2001–02) ||14–7–2–3 || 
|-

|-  style="text-align:center; background:#cfc;"
|27||W||December 1, 2001||4–1 || style="text-align:left;"|  Chicago Blackhawks (2001–02) ||15–7–2–3 || 
|-  style="text-align:center; background:#fbb;"
|28||L||December 4, 2001||0–1 || style="text-align:left;"|  Pittsburgh Penguins (2001–02) ||15–8–2–3 || 
|-  style="text-align:center; background:#cfc;"
|29||W||December 6, 2001||6–3 || style="text-align:left;"| @ New York Rangers (2001–02) ||16–8–2–3 || 
|-  style="text-align:center; background:#cfc;"
|30||W||December 8, 2001||4–3 || style="text-align:left;"|  New York Rangers (2001–02) ||17–8–2–3 || 
|-  style="text-align:center; background:#cfc;"
|31||W||December 11, 2001||6–3 || style="text-align:left;"|  Phoenix Coyotes (2001–02) ||18–8–2–3 || 
|-  style="text-align:center; background:#cfc;"
|32||W||December 13, 2001||4–3 OT|| style="text-align:left;"| @ St. Louis Blues (2001–02) ||19–8–2–3 || 
|-  style="text-align:center; background:#cfc;"
|33||W||December 15, 2001||6–4 || style="text-align:left;"|  Montreal Canadiens (2001–02) ||20–8–2–3 || 
|-  style="text-align:center; background:#fbb;"
|34||L||December 18, 2001||1–3 || style="text-align:left;"|  Los Angeles Kings (2001–02) ||20–9–2–3 || 
|- style="text-align:center;"
|35||T||December 21, 2001||3–3 OT|| style="text-align:left;"| @ Buffalo Sabres (2001–02) ||20–9–3–3 || 
|-  style="text-align:center; background:#cfc;"
|36||W||December 22, 2001||3–2 || style="text-align:left;"|  Buffalo Sabres (2001–02) ||21–9–3–3 || 
|-  style="text-align:center; background:#fbb;"
|37||L||December 26, 2001||3–4 || style="text-align:left;"| @ Carolina Hurricanes (2001–02) ||21–10–3–3 || 
|-  style="text-align:center; background:#fbb;"
|38||L||December 28, 2001||4–5 || style="text-align:left;"| @ Atlanta Thrashers (2001–02) ||21–11–3–3 || 
|-  style="text-align:center; background:#fbb;"
|39||L||December 29, 2001||2–4 || style="text-align:left;"| @ Florida Panthers (2001–02) ||21–12–3–3 || 
|-  style="text-align:center; background:#cfc;"
|40||W||December 31, 2001||4–1 || style="text-align:left;"| @ Tampa Bay Lightning (2001–02) ||22–12–3–3 || 
|-

|-  style="text-align:center; background:#cfc;"
|41||W||January 3, 2002||2–1 || style="text-align:left;"| @ Boston Bruins (2001–02) ||23–12–3–3 || 
|-  style="text-align:center; background:#cfc;"
|42||W||January 5, 2002||3–1 || style="text-align:left;"|  Ottawa Senators (2001–02) ||24–12–3–3 || 
|-  style="text-align:center; background:#fbb;"
|43||L||January 7, 2002||3–4 || style="text-align:left;"| @ Ottawa Senators (2001–02) ||24–13–3–3 || 
|-  style="text-align:center; background:#cfc;"
|44||W||January 8, 2002||4–3 || style="text-align:left;"|  Nashville Predators (2001–02) ||25–13–3–3 || 
|- style="text-align:center;"
|45||T||January 11, 2002||3–3 OT|| style="text-align:left;"| @ Washington Capitals (2001–02) ||25–13–4–3 || 
|- style="text-align:center;"
|46||T||January 12, 2002||1–1 OT|| style="text-align:left;"|  Montreal Canadiens (2001–02) ||25–13–5–3 || 
|-  style="text-align:center; background:#fbb;"
|47||L||January 15, 2002||2–3 || style="text-align:left;"|  Atlanta Thrashers (2001–02) ||25–14–5–3 || 
|-  style="text-align:center; background:#ffc;"
|48||OTL||January 17, 2002||2–3 OT|| style="text-align:left;"| @ Nashville Predators (2001–02) ||25–14–5–4 || 
|-  style="text-align:center; background:#fbb;"
|49||L||January 19, 2002||0–3 || style="text-align:left;"|  Philadelphia Flyers (2001–02) ||25–15–5–4 || 
|-  style="text-align:center; background:#cfc;"
|50||W||January 22, 2002||6–1 || style="text-align:left;"| @ Calgary Flames (2001–02) ||26–15–5–4 || 
|-  style="text-align:center; background:#fbb;"
|51||L||January 25, 2002||1–6 || style="text-align:left;"| @ Vancouver Canucks (2001–02) ||26–16–5–4 || 
|-  style="text-align:center; background:#fbb;"
|52||L||January 26, 2002||1–4 || style="text-align:left;"| @ Edmonton Oilers (2001–02) ||26–17–5–4 || 
|-  style="text-align:center; background:#cfc;"
|53||W||January 29, 2002||4–3 || style="text-align:left;"|  San Jose Sharks (2001–02) ||27–17–5–4 || 
|-  style="text-align:center; background:#cfc;"
|54||W||January 30, 2002||6–0 || style="text-align:left;"| @ Atlanta Thrashers (2001–02) ||28–17–5–4 || 
|-

|-  style="text-align:center; background:#cfc;"
|55||W||February 5, 2002||3–1 || style="text-align:left;"|  Minnesota Wild (2001–02) ||29–17–5–4 || 
|-  style="text-align:center; background:#fbb;"
|56||L||February 7, 2002||1–4 || style="text-align:left;"| @ New York Islanders (2001–02) ||29–18–5–4 || 
|-  style="text-align:center; background:#cfc;"
|57||W||February 9, 2002||4–1 || style="text-align:left;"|  Montreal Canadiens (2001–02) ||30–18–5–4 || 
|-  style="text-align:center; background:#cfc;"
|58||W||February 11, 2002||5–4 || style="text-align:left;"|  Atlanta Thrashers (2001–02) ||31–18–5–4 || 
|-  style="text-align:center; background:#cfc;"
|59||W||February 26, 2002||4–1 || style="text-align:left;"|  Carolina Hurricanes (2001–02) ||32–18–5–4 || 
|-

|-  style="text-align:center; background:#fbb;"
|60||L||March 1, 2002||2–4 || style="text-align:left;"| @ New Jersey Devils (2001–02) ||32–19–5–4 || 
|- style="text-align:center;"
|61||T||March 2, 2002||3–3 OT|| style="text-align:left;"|  Buffalo Sabres (2001–02) ||32–19–6–4 || 
|-  style="text-align:center; background:#cfc;"
|62||W||March 4, 2002||3–2 || style="text-align:left;"| @ Washington Capitals (2001–02) ||33–19–6–4 || 
|-  style="text-align:center; background:#fbb;"
|63||L||March 6, 2002||2–6 || style="text-align:left;"| @ Detroit Red Wings (2001–02) ||33–20–6–4 || 
|- style="text-align:center;"
|64||T||March 9, 2002||1–1 OT|| style="text-align:left;"| @ Montreal Canadiens (2001–02) ||33–20–7–4 || 
|-  style="text-align:center; background:#cfc;"
|65||W||March 10, 2002||3–1 || style="text-align:left;"| @ Philadelphia Flyers (2001–02) ||34–20–7–4 || 
|- style="text-align:center;"
|66||T||March 12, 2002||1–1 OT|| style="text-align:left;"|  Philadelphia Flyers (2001–02) ||34–20–8–4 || 
|-  style="text-align:center; background:#cfc;"
|67||W||March 14, 2002||2–1 || style="text-align:left;"| @ Boston Bruins (2001–02) ||35–20–8–4 || 
|- style="text-align:center;"
|68||T||March 16, 2002||5–5 OT|| style="text-align:left;"|  Dallas Stars (2001–02) ||35–20–9–4 || 
|-  style="text-align:center; background:#cfc;"
|69||W||March 19, 2002||3–2 OT|| style="text-align:left;"|  New York Islanders (2001–02) ||36–20–9–4 || 
|-  style="text-align:center; background:#fbb;"
|70||L||March 21, 2002||3–4 || style="text-align:left;"|  Washington Capitals (2001–02) ||36–21–9–4 || 
|-  style="text-align:center; background:#cfc;"
|71||W||March 23, 2002||2–0 || style="text-align:left;"|  Buffalo Sabres (2001–02) ||37–21–9–4 || 
|-  style="text-align:center; background:#fbb;"
|72||L||March 25, 2002||1–4 || style="text-align:left;"| @ Philadelphia Flyers (2001–02) ||37–22–9–4 || 
|-  style="text-align:center; background:#cfc;"
|73||W||March 26, 2002||7–2 || style="text-align:left;"|  Tampa Bay Lightning (2001–02) ||38–22–9–4 || 
|-  style="text-align:center; background:#fbb;"
|74||L||March 28, 2002||4–5 || style="text-align:left;"|  New York Islanders (2001–02) ||38–23–9–4 || 
|-  style="text-align:center; background:#fbb;"
|75||L||March 30, 2002||1–3 || style="text-align:left;"|  New Jersey Devils (2001–02) ||38–24–9–4 || 
|-

|-  style="text-align:center; background:#cfc;"
|76||W||April 1, 2002||5–4 OT|| style="text-align:left;"| @ Detroit Red Wings (2001–02) ||39–24–9–4 || 
|-  style="text-align:center; background:#fbb;"
|77||L||April 4, 2002||2–4 || style="text-align:left;"|  New York Rangers (2001–02) ||39–25–9–4 || 
|- style="text-align:center;"
|78||T||April 6, 2002||2–2 OT|| style="text-align:left;"|  Florida Panthers (2001–02) ||39–25–10–4 || 
|-  style="text-align:center; background:#cfc;"
|79||W||April 8, 2002||4–1 || style="text-align:left;"|  Columbus Blue Jackets (2001–02) ||40–25–10–4 || 
|-  style="text-align:center; background:#cfc;"
|80||W||April 10, 2002||7–2 || style="text-align:left;"| @ New York Rangers (2001–02) ||41–25–10–4 || 
|-  style="text-align:center; background:#cfc;"
|81||W||April 12, 2002||5–2 || style="text-align:left;"| @ Pittsburgh Penguins (2001–02) ||42–25–10–4 || 
|-  style="text-align:center; background:#cfc;"
|82||W||April 13, 2002||5–2 || style="text-align:left;"| @ Ottawa Senators (2001–02) ||43–25–10–4 || 
|-

|-
| Legend:

 † Hockey Hall of Fame Game

Playoffs

|- style="background:#cfc;"
| 1 ||W || April 18, 2002 || 3–1 || style="text-align:left;"| New York Islanders || 19,438 || Maple Leafs lead 1–0 || 
|- style="background:#cfc;"
| 2 ||W || April 20, 2002 || 2–0 || style="text-align:left;"| New York Islanders || 19,434 || Maple Leafs lead 2–0 || 
|- style="background:#fbb;"
| 3 ||L || April 23, 2002 || 1–6 || style="text-align:left;"| @ New York Islanders || 16,234 || Maple Leafs lead 2–1 || 
|- style="background:#fbb;"
| 4 ||L || April 24, 2002 || 3–4 || style="text-align:left;"| @ New York Islanders || 16,234 || Series tied 2–2 || 
|- style="background:#cfc;"
| 5 ||W || April 26, 2002 || 6–3 || style="text-align:left;"| New York Islanders || 19,458 || Maple Leafs lead 3–2 || 
|- style="background:#fbb;"
| 6 ||L || April 28, 2002 || 3–5 || style="text-align:left;"| @ New York Islanders || 16,234 || Series tied 3–3 || 
|- style="background:#cfc;"
| 7 ||W || April 30, 2002 || 4–2 || style="text-align:left;"| New York Islanders || 19,519 || Maple Leafs win 4–3|| 
|-

|- style="background:#fbb;"
| 1 ||L || May 2, 2002 || 0–5 || style="text-align:left;"| Ottawa Senators || 19,406 || Senators lead 1–0 || 
|- style="background:#cfc;"
| 2 ||W || May 4, 2002 || 3–2 3OT || style="text-align:left;"| Ottawa Senators || 19,454 || Series tied 1–1 || 
|- style="background:#fbb;"
| 3 ||L || May 6, 2002 || 2–3 || style="text-align:left;"| @ Ottawa Senators || 18,500 || Senators lead 2–1 || 
|- style="background:#cfc;"
| 4 ||W || May 8, 2002 || 2–1 || style="text-align:left;"| @ Ottawa Senators || 18,500 || Series tied 2–2 || 
|- style="background:#fbb;"
| 5 ||L || May 10, 2002 || 2–4 || style="text-align:left;"| Ottawa Senators || 19,499 || Senators lead 3–2 || 
|- style="background:#cfc;"
| 6 ||W || May 12, 2002 || 4–3 || style="text-align:left;"| @ Ottawa Senators || 18,500 || Series tied 3–3 || 
|- style="background:#cfc;"
| 7 ||W || May 14, 2002 || 3–0 || style="text-align:left;"| Ottawa Senators || 19,551 || Maple Leafs win 4–3|| 
|-

|- style="background:#cfc;"
| 1 ||W || May 16, 2002 || 2–1 || style="text-align:left;"| @ Carolina Hurricanes || 18,730 || Maple Leafs lead 1–0 || 
|- style="background:#fbb;"
| 2 ||L || May 19, 2002 || 1–2 OT || style="text-align:left;"| @ Carolina Hurricanes || 18,924 || Series tied 1–1 || 
|- style="background:#fbb;"
| 3 ||L || May 21, 2002 || 1–2 OT || style="text-align:left;"| Carolina Hurricanes || 19,293 || Hurricanes lead 2–1 || 
|- style="background:#fbb;"
| 4 ||L || May 23, 2002 || 0–3 || style="text-align:left;"| Carolina Hurricanes || 19,299 || Hurricanes lead 3–1 || 
|- style="background:#cfc;"
| 5 ||W || May 25, 2002 || 1–0 || style="text-align:left;"| @ Carolina Hurricanes || 19,016 || Hurricanes lead 3-2 || 
|- style="background:#fbb;"
| 6 ||L || May 28, 2002 || 1–2 OT || style="text-align:left;"| Carolina Hurricanes || 19,327 || Hurricanes win 4–2|| 
|-

|-
|Legend:

Player statistics

Scoring
 Position abbreviations: C = Centre; D = Defence; G = Goaltender; LW = Left Wing; RW = Right Wing
  = Joined team via a transaction (e.g., trade, waivers, signing) during the season. Stats reflect time with the Maple Leafs only.
  = Left team via a transaction (e.g., trade, waivers, release) during the season. Stats reflect time with the Maple Leafs only.

Goaltending
  = Joined team via a transaction (e.g., trade, waivers, signing) during the season. Stats reflect time with the Maple Leafs only.

Awards and records
 Mats Sundin, Centre, NHL Second Team All-Star

Transactions
The Maple Leafs were involved in the following transactions from June 10, 2001, the day after the deciding game of the 2001 Stanley Cup Finals, through June 13, 2002, the day of the deciding game of the 2002 Stanley Cup Finals.

Trades

Players acquired

Players lost

Signings

Draft picks
Toronto's picks at the 2001 NHL Entry Draft in Sunrise, Florida.

Farm teams

American Hockey League 
St. John's Maple Leafs

ECHL
Columbia Inferno

See also
 2001–02 NHL season

Notes

References

Toronto Maple Leafs season, 2001-02
Toronto Maple Leafs seasons
Toronto